Princess Rose is Yukari Tamura's eleventh single, released on December 20, 2006. Princess Rose is the second opening theme song for the  TV series and the latest opening theme song for her radio show, . Present is the latest ending theme song for her radio show.

Track listing
 Princess Rose
 Lyrics: Yukiko Mitsui
 Arrangement and composition: Yukari Hashimoto
 
 Lyrics and composition: Hayato Tanaka
 Arrangement: Kono Shin
 
 Lyrics: Manami Fujino
 Arrangement and composition: Masatomo Ota

References 

Yukari Tamura songs
2006 singles
Songs with music by Yukari Hashimoto
2006 songs